Illegal Music 3 (stylized as Illegal Music 3: The Finale) is the third and final mixtape of the "Illegal Music" series by Nigerian rapper M.I. It was released by Chocolate City on 29 February 2016. The mixtape features guest appearances from Ruby Gyang, Ckay, Pryse, Khaligraph Jones, and Poe. It was supported by the single "Everything I Have Seen", which was released on 11 February 2016. The mixtape's production was primarily handled by M.I, with additional production from Ckay and G-Plus.

Track listing

References

M.I albums
2016 mixtape albums
Albums produced by M.I
Chocolate City (music label) albums
Albums produced by G-Plus